Abbot of Shaolin (少林英雄榜) aka Shaolin Abbot aka Slice of Death is a Shaw Brothers film directed by Ho Meng Hua. It is a Shaolin Temple-themed martial arts film about their rebellion against the Qing, featuring David Chiang and Lo Lieh as Priest Pai Mei.

Plot 
The Monk Chi San (David Chiang) is sent by his Shaolin masters to learn a special kung fu from a Wu-Tang priest and befriends his niece Wu Mei (Lily Li). The priest's brother is Pai Mei (Lo Lieh), who disapproves of his associating with Shaolin rebels who oppose the Qing, leaves as his nephew Dao De (Ku Kuan Chun) remains behind to cause trouble for Chi San. While Chi San is in training, the Qing soldiers and a northern Lama attack and destroy Shaolin Temple. Chi San arrives too late as the attack has already run its course. His master orders him to go to the south to search for loyal Shaolin men and rebuild the temple.

Pai Mei is promoted by the court, returns to his brother's temple, and arranges for his nephew to poison him. He then attacks the priest himself and kills him for teaching Chi San kung fu. Pai Mei orders the search for Chi San so that he may kill him. Chi San arrives in the south and assists a local businessman, Mr. Li who is being robbed. The grateful man takes Chi San into his home. At this point Chi San gains his first student, Jin Lun nephew of Mr Li and goes through various integrity "tests" from local businessmen to prove if he is a true Shaolin monk. Chi San succeeds and the impressed businessmen offer to help him rebuild the temple. Chi San also gains more students after a butcher and a knife grinder fail in their attempts to beat him at kung fu.

Pai Mei and his nephew then attempt to kill Wu Mei, but she is rescued by Chi San and his students. Chi San orders his students to head south to wait on a ferry while he pursues Pai Mei and the Lama. Chi San meets the lama in the woods and defeats him but Pai Mei intercepts Wu Mei and the students. Chi San arrives before Pai Mei can kill them and defeats Pai Mei.

Casts
David Chiang aka David Chiang Da-Wei 	... 	Monk Chi San
Lo Lieh 	... 	Pai Mei
Ching Miao aka Cheng Miu 	... 	Mr. Li
Ku Kuan-Chung 	... 	Dao De
Lily Li aka Lily Li-Li 	... 	Wu Mei
Norman Chui 	... 	Li Jin-Lun
Yeung Chi-Hing 	... 	Wu Chan
Chiang Tao 	... 	Tibetan Lama/Yuan Guan
Helen Poon Bing-Seung 	... 	Miss Jinbao
Si Wai  	... 	Emperor
Bruce Tong Yim-Chaan 	... 	Shaolin recruit Hong Xi-Guan
Chan Shen 	... 	Dan Tian-Gang
Shum Lo 	... 	Head Abbot
Yue Wing 	... 	General Yue Ying-Qi
Chiang Nan  	... 	General Li
Sai Gwa-Pau 	... 	Stuttering servant
Wong Ching-Ho 	... 	Wang
Jamie Luk Kim-Ming 	... 	Shaolin recruit Lin
Wang Han-Chen 	... 	Magistrate
Ng Hong-Sang 	... 	Shaolin recruit Gong Qian-Jin
Keung Hon 	... 	Li Ba-Shan
Lee Sau-Kei 	... 	Rich man
Wong Chi-Ming  	... 	Bandit
Hsu Hsia 	... 	Soldier
Siu Tak-Foo 	... 	Shaolin student
Chik Ngai-Hung 	... 	Bandit
Tam Bo 	... 	Monk
Kwok Yan-Chi 	... 	Shaolin recruit Gui Jue-Qi
Lui Tat 	... 	Rich man
Tai Gwan-Tak 	... 	Traitor monk
Huang Ha  	... 	Soldier
Kong Chuen  	... 	Soldier
Lau Cheun 	... 	Servant
Gam Tin-Chue 	... 	Rich man
Wong Kung-Miu 	... 	Servant
Fung Ging-Man 	... 	Man at palace

References

External links 
 
 

1979 films
Hong Kong martial arts films
Kung fu films
Shaw Brothers Studio films
Films set in the Qing dynasty
Films directed by Ho Meng Hua
1970s Hong Kong films